Karol Sobczak (born 27 February 1972) is a former Polish footballer, manager, educator, councilor and is currently mayor of Olecko.

Biography

Sobczak was born in Olecko in 1972. He is known to have played for the Wigry Suwałki youth team, progressing to the first team for the 1988–89 season. In 1989 he joined Lechia Gdańsk, spending 6 seasons with the club. In total he made 151 appearances in all competitions and scored 19 goals, with most of his appearances coming in the II liga. During the winter transfer window Sobczak joined Polonia Warsaw, winning the league and being promoted to the Ekstraklasa in his first season. It is known that Sobczak made 5 appearances for Polonia in the Ekstraklasa that season as Polonia struggled and ended up being relegated back to the II liga. In the final years of his career Sobczak played for Hetman Zamość and Górnik Łęczna. Sobczak retired from playing football in 2001 aged 29.

In 1997 he graduated from the Academy of Physical Education in Gdańsk with a masters in physical education with a view of what he wanted to do after his playing career. He used his degree when he started working in a school as a PE teacher. He also achieved a 1st class in football coaching. In 2001 Sobczak started working as a footballing coach, working with Czarni Olecko, Płomień Ełk and Unia Olecko and winning promotions with each of the three clubs.

Sobczak was a councilor in Olecko for 12 years, and became the mayor of Olecko on 23 November 2018.

References 

1972 births
Living people
Polish footballers
Wigry Suwałki players
Lechia Gdańsk players
Polonia Warsaw players
Górnik Łęczna players
Mayors of places in Poland
Association football midfielders